German submarine U-867 was a Type IXC/40 U-boat of Nazi Germany's Kriegsmarine built for service during the Second World War.

Design
German Type IXC/40 submarines were slightly larger than the original Type IXCs. U-867 had a displacement of  when at the surface and  while submerged. She had two shafts and two  propellers.

U-867 was fitted with six  torpedo tubes (four fitted at the bow and two at the stern), 22 torpedoes, one  SK C/32 naval gun, 180 rounds, and a  Flak M42 as well as two twin  C/30 anti-aircraft guns. The boat had a complement of forty-eight.

Service history
She was ordered	on 25 August 1941 and laid down in Bremen, Germany on 5 February 1943, being launched on 24 August 1943. She had one commander, Kapitän zur See Arved von Mühlendahl, for her one patrol. She had a complement of 60.

U-867 was scuttled on 19 September 1944 north-west of Bergen, Norway after depth charges were dropped from a British RAF B-24 Liberator which badly damaged her.

References

Bibliography

External links

German Type IX submarines
U-boats commissioned in 1943
1943 ships
World War II submarines of Germany
Ships built in Bremen (state)
U-boats sunk in 1944
U-boats sunk by British aircraft
U-boats sunk by depth charges
World War II shipwrecks in the Norwegian Sea
Ships lost with all hands
Maritime incidents in September 1944